Mossville station was a railway station along the Chicago, Rock Island and Pacific Railway in Mossville, Illinois. The station was alongside Illinois Route 29 and the Illinois River. It was a flag stop for trains such as the Peoria Rocket, between Chicago and Peoria. Freight operations are still provided on the single track line by Iowa Interstate.

References

Former Chicago, Rock Island and Pacific Railroad stations
Former railway stations in Illinois
Transportation buildings and structures in Peoria County, Illinois